Henry Faithful (10 August 1794 – 17 February 1851) was an English cricketer who played for Sussex. He was born in Kingsworthy and died in Hurst Row.

Faithful made two first-class appearances during June 1823. His debut saw him take one catch and score one run in a Sussex victory. Faithful's second and final game was an innings victory against Marylebone Cricket Club.

External links
Henry Faithful at Cricket Archive 

1794 births
1851 deaths
English cricketers
Sussex cricketers
English cricketers of 1787 to 1825